IPNC may refer to the following:

International Pinot Noir Celebration
International Plant Nutrition Colloquium
International Pathogenic Neisseria Conference